Eutreta aczeli is a species of fruit fly in the family Tephritidae.

Distribution
Colombia, Brazil.

References

Tephritinae
Insects described in 1954
Diptera of South America